Super Tuesday was a 1-hour professional wrestling television special event, produced by the World Wrestling Entertainment (WWE) that aired on November 12, 2002 (which was taped November 4 & 5) at the Fleet Center in Boston, Massachusetts and Verizon Wireless Arena in Manchester, New Hampshire, which featured matches from both Raw and SmackDown. It was a preview for Survivor Series and aired on UPN.

From 2004 to 2008 WWE held a pay-per-view named Taboo Tuesday (2004-2005), which later became Cyber Sunday (2006-2008).

The event featured three matches where the main event was a Ten-man tag team match in which the World Heavyweight Champion Triple H, Chris Jericho, Christian, and 3-Minute Warning (Rosey and Jamal) defeated Rob Van Dam, Kane, Booker T, Bubba Ray Dudley and Jeff Hardy, after Triple H pinned Kane.

The other two matches were: Eddie Guerrero defeated Chris Benoit and Edge in a Triple threat match, and Trish Stratus fought to a no-contest Torrie Wilson in a Bikini contest after Nidia interfered.

Results

See also
2002 in professional wrestling
Taboo Tuesday/Cyber Sunday

References

2002 in professional wrestling
Professional wrestling in New Hampshire
Entertainment events in Boston
Events in New Hampshire
WWE shows
2002 in Boston
2002 in New Hampshire
Tourist attractions in Manchester, New Hampshire
Professional wrestling in Boston
November 2002 events in the United States